"" is a German Psalm paraphrase by Johann Georg Albinus. It is not to be confused with:
 "Herr, straf mich nicht in deinem Zorn / Das bitt ich dich von Herzen", another German paraphrase of Psalm 6
 "Herr, straf mich nicht in deinem Zorn / Lass mich dein Grimm verzehren nicht", a German paraphrase of Psalm 38
 Straf mich nicht in deinem Zorn!, a chorale fantasia for organ by Max Reger